Place Dalida is a square in Montmartre, in the 18th arrondissement of Paris, named after the French music icon Dalida. Many fans and tourists visit the place to pay tribute to the artist.

History
Dalida loved the neighbourhood of Montmartre, where she lived. To honour her, by decree on December 5, 1996, Paris City Hall created the "Place Dalida". A bronze bust of the singer was added on 24 April 1997, to mark the 10th anniversary of her death.

Description

The square is on the large corner of two picturesque Montmartre streets, Rue Girardon and Rue de l'Abreuvoir. Rue Girardon spreads from south to the north and it connects with the Rue de l'Abreuvoir. From that point, Rue de l'Abreuvoir spreads in direction west–east, a configuration that makes an L-shaped street.

Three trees surround the bronze bust which is atop five blocks of cut granite. The bust was sculpted by the French artist Aslan. On the highest stone block on the statue, one underneath the bust, there is an engraved plague saying; "YOLANDA GIGLIOTTI, dite DALIDA, chanteuse comédienne, 1933–1987" (English: "YOLANDA GIGLIOTTI, known as DALIDA, singer actress, 1933–1987").

In popular culture
 Specifically location Dalida 75018 Paris, France makes an appearance in the Activision first-person shooter video game title Call of Duty: Modern Warfare 3 as the multiplayer map 'Resistance', pitting the French GIGN against the invading Russian Forces. The entire map is completely modeled after this location.
 A short scene of the 2013 French movie It Boy was filmed on the square.
 Square is used during 2013 for filming few scenes of 3 Days to Kill  that is directed by McG, starring Kevin Costner.
 The square is featured in the fifth episode of the 2020 Netflix comedy-drama series Emily in Paris.

References

External links

 Official Website

Dalida
Montmartre
Cultural depictions of Dalida
18th arrondissement of Paris